Emilio Carlos Homps (September 28, 1914 – November 2, 2012) was an Argentine Olympic sailor who competed at the 1948 Summer Olympics in London. He won a silver medal in the 6 metre class event, alongside teammates Enrique Sieburger, Sr., Rufino Rodríguez de la Torre, Rodolfo Rivademar, Julio Sieburger, and Enrique Sieburger, Jr. Born in San Pedro, Argentina, he was a member of the Yacht Club Olivos and received his Olympic ship, the Djinn, from the Argentine Navy. As a youth, he also swam, rowed, and played rugby union at the national level. In 2006 he was awarded an honorary diploma from the city of Vicente López for his lifelong successes in sport.

References

1914 births
2012 deaths
Argentine male sailors (sport)
Olympic sailors of Argentina
Sailors at the 1948 Summer Olympics – 6 Metre
Olympic silver medalists for Argentina
Olympic medalists in sailing
Medalists at the 1948 Summer Olympics